My Friend the Monkey is a 1939 Fleischer Studios animated short film starring Betty Boop.

Synopsis
A hurdy-gurdy man comes by Betty Boop's house. She wants to buy his cute baby monkey. While Betty is outside haggling over the price, the monkey is inside causing plenty of trouble for Pudgy the Pup.

References

External links
My Friend The Monkey on Youtube.
My Friend the Monkey at the  Big Cartoon Database.

1939 short films
Betty Boop cartoons
1930s American animated films
American black-and-white films
Paramount Pictures short films
1939 animated films
Fleischer Studios short films
Short films directed by Dave Fleischer
1930s English-language films
American animated short films
Animated films about dogs
Animated films about monkeys